"Quiero Ser" (I want to be) is a song written  by Amaia Montero for her 2008 debut solo album Amaia Montero. The song is the album's opening track, and was released as its first single.

The single was premiered on Spanish radio station "Los 40 Principales". In January 2009, it became the longest charting number one single in the Spanish airplay history with 13 consecutive weeks in the number one spot.

Charts

Certifications

References

Songs written by Amaia Montero
Spanish songs
2008 songs